Taloga is a town in Dewey County, Oklahoma, United States. The population was 299 at the 2010 census. It is the county seat of Dewey County. The town lies near the southern bank of a bend of the Canadian River, along U.S. Route 183, approximately thirty-seven miles north of Clinton. According to the Encyclopedia of Oklahoma History and Culture, the name is of Indian origin and means either "beautiful valley" or "rocking water".

The Taloga Wind project outside of town, dedicated in March 2012, can generate up to 130 megawatts of power, which is enough to meet the needs of about 35,000 homes. All electricity produced by the project is provided to Oklahoma Gas and Electric Company under a 20-year power purchase agreement.

The Dewey County Courthouse, from 1925, is on the NHRP listings.

Geography
Taloga is located at  (36.040273, -98.963363). The Canadian River flows nearby.

Canton Lake is to the east-northeast.

Demographics

As of the census of 2000, there were 372 people, 147 households, and 98 families residing in the town. There were 185 housing units at an average density of 366.6 per square mile (142.9/km2). The racial makeup of the town was 94.09% White, 0.81% African American, 2.69% Native American, 1.61% from other races, and 0.81% from two or more races. Hispanic or Latino of any race were 6.18% of the population. These figures are questionable because when added together, they equal more than 100%.

There were 147 households, out of which 29.3% had children under the age of 18 living with them, 59.2% were married couples living together, 5.4% had a female householder with no husband present, and 33.3% were non-families. 31.3% of all households were made up of individuals, and 16.3% had someone living alone who was 65 years of age or older. The average household size was 2.44 and the average family size was 3.10.

In the town, the population was spread out, with 26.6% under the age of 18, 6.5% from 18 to 24, 27.2% from 25 to 44, 24.7% from 45 to 64, and 15.1% who were 65 years of age or older. The median age was 40 years. For every 100 females, there were 96.8 males. For every 100 females age 18 and over, there were 96.4 males.

The median income for a household in the town was $33,281, and the median income for a family was $38,750. Males had a median income of $27,083 versus $21,875 for females. The per capita income for the town was $16,343. About 6.8% of families and 11.5% of the population were below the poverty line, including 12.7% of those under age 18 and 6.5% of those age 65 or over.

Notable person
 Jordy Mercer, professional baseball player

References

External links
 Taloga Public Schools

Towns in Dewey County, Oklahoma
Towns in Oklahoma
County seats in Oklahoma